Saddan Cave is a major Buddhist cave temple with hundreds of small Buddha statues.  It is located in the southernmost point of the Zwegabin Mountain range, Hpa-An, Kayin State, Myanmar.  Saddan Cave is 107 meters long from east to west and 40 meters wide, and is the longest cave in Karen State with a narrow entrance. The cave is located at a height of about 30 feet from the ground and has a round shape. The cave is named after Saddan, the king of elephants who lived near the cave. The largest of the stalagmites is called the "Stone Pillar of the King of Elephants". The Saddan Cave Pagoda festival is held every year on the last day of Thingyan. At the exit of Saddan Cave, there is a large lake, which is said to be King Saddan's bathing lake. Saddan Cave was a resting place for the legendary King Paarwana (ပအာဝနမင်းကြီး) when he was a hunter, according to Karen legend.

Gallery

References 

Buddhist caves in Myanmar
Buildings and structures in Kayin State